Aranyakam (Malayalam:ആരണ്യകം, English:Forest) is a 1988 Malayalam film, directed by Hariharan, written by M. T. Vasudevan Nair and starring Saleema, Devan and Vineeth. The film was produced by B. Sasikumar. The music was composed by Raghunath Seth, with lyrics by O. N. V. Kurup and vocals by K. J. Yesudas and K. S. Chitra. It is about a teenage girl named Ammini who likes to visit forests and has a hobby of writing imaginary letters to famous people. Actress Saleema memorably portrays Ammini. She remains one of the few quirky female characters in Malayalam cinema till date.

Plot 
The film handles the issue of exploitation of Adivasis by feudal lords, and that of Naxalism which attempts to resist and counter this, and of how the feudal lords use the "system" to suppress the resistance. The film speaks through the eyes of protagonist Ammini (Saleema), a 16 old girl whose life takes a turn when Mohan (Vineeth), who has love interest on her and a stranger (Devan), who inspires her and believes in her brilliance unlike everyone else, enters her life. The latter turns out to be a Naxalite who has been conspiring to kill her uncle, a feudal lord (Jagannatha Varma), who has been exploiting the tribal community in the area for his own personal interests.

Cast 
 Saleema as Ammini, the protagonist who aspires to be a writer
 Devan as a stranger / naxal activist 
 Vineeth as Mohan, cousin of the protagonist, and a research scholar who does academic research on Adivasis
 Nedumudi Venu as a feudal lord and grandfather of the protagonist
 Jagannatha Varma as Madhavan Nair, a feudal lord and a relative of the protagonist
 Parvathy as Shailaja, a cousin of the protagonist
 Balan K. Nair as Ravunni, a police officer
 Bahadoor as Nanu, house keeper at the feudal home
 Prathapachandran as Nambiar
 Captain Raju as a police officer
 Sukumari as Madhavan Nair's wife
Valsala Menon as Nambiar's wife
 Deepthi

Soundtrack

References

External links
 

1988 films
1980s Malayalam-language films
Films with screenplays by M. T. Vasudevan Nair
Films directed by Hariharan
Films about Naxalism